Countess Maria von Nesselrode-Ehreshoven (1786-1849), was a Russian Empire courtier.

Early life
Maria was born as the eldest daughter of Count Dmitry Guryev (1758-1825) and Countess Praskovya Nikolaevna Saltykova (1764-1830).

Court life
She served as lady in waiting to empress Elizabeth Alexeievna (Louise of Baden). She was married to German Count Karl von Nesselrode-Ehreshoven. She was a leading socialite in St Petersburg society and court life, hosted an influential salon, had high positions within philanthropy, and was described as politically active through her spouse.

References 
 Таньшина Н. Русский кисель на немецкой закваске. Неофициальный портрет Карла Нессельроде // Родина : журнал. — Москва, 2009. — № 5. — С. 75-79.

1786 births
1849 deaths
Ladies-in-waiting from the Russian Empire
Salon holders from the Russian Empire
Burials at the Dukhovskaya Church